Hasan Amat (alternatively Hason or Hassan; 1894–1917) was a Canadian soldier. Born in Singapore, he served as a private in the Royal Canadian Regiment, the 4th Overseas Pioneer Battalion, and the 1st Canadian Infantry Battalion. Amat died at the Battle of Hill 70; he was one of 22 Muslim Canadians to serve and the only one to die in the First World War. He is recognized on the Vimy Memorial.

References

External links
Canadian Virtual War Memorial

1894 births
1917 deaths
Canadian military personnel killed in World War I
Canadian Expeditionary Force soldiers
Canadian Army soldiers